Peter W. Martin has been a law professor since 1972, and Dean from 1980 to 1988, at Cornell Law School. In 1992, together with Thomas R. Bruce, he co-founded the Legal Information Institute at Cornell Law.

References

External links
Faculty page at Cornell Law School

American legal scholars
Cornell University faculty
Living people
Year of birth missing (living people)